I Didn't Mean to Haunt You is the third studio album by American musician Quadeca. It was released on November 10, 2022, through deadAir and AWAL, as a direct follow-up to his previous studio album From Me to You. The album features collaborations with Danny Brown, the Sunday Service Choir, & Thor Harris, and was released alongside a visual album on YouTube.

Production 
I Didn't Mean to Haunt You was recorded at Trend Def Studios in Los Angeles, California. All tracks on the album are written, produced, and mixed by Quadeca himself, with additional writing from featured artists (when applicable).

The album was mastered by Christian Wright at Abbey Road Studios.

Promotion and release

Promotion 
A forthcoming album was announced at the end of the visual album released alongside the deluxe edition of From Me to You, with text reading "New album in progress... announcements soon." The synths in the background would be used as the opener to track "Sorry4dying." The album was originally announced to release on November 11, 2022, however, it was released on November 10.

Singles 
"Born Yesterday" was released as the first single from I Didn't Mean to Haunt You on September 19, 2022. "Tell Me a Joke" was released as the second single from the album on October 25, 2022. Both singles were accompanied with music videos.

Following the album's release, a music video for the song "Fractions of Infinity" was released on November 17, 2022.

Visual album 
I Didn't Mean to Haunt You was released alongside a visual album billed as an album movie, much like From Me to You. The movie was shot by Quadeca and Thad Swift, and edited by Quadeca.

Lyrics 
I Didn't Mean to Haunt You is a concept album, similar to his previous two albums Voice Memos and From Me to You, and follows the story of a deceased muse, presumably a fictionalized version of Quadeca, experiencing limbo as a ghost after committing suicide.  Later on the muse attempts to bring a family member into limbo with him by leaving the gas stove on.

Critical reception 

I Didn't Mean to Haunt You was met with critical acclaim from only a few sources. 

The album resonated particularly with listeners among Internet communities, who boosted a lot of the reputation it gained upon release. Given Quadeca's former status as a YouTube rapper and a guest on Internet shows such as HIVEMIND, a lot of the attention this album received came to being in online spaces. In review aggregator platform Album of the Year, it's one of the highest rated albums released in 2022.

Track listing 

Notes
 All tracks are stylized in all lowercase.

References 

2022 albums
AWAL albums